Tempe Church is a parish church of the Church of Norway in Trondheim municipality in Trøndelag county, Norway. It is located in the Lerkendal area in the city of Trondheim, between the old European route E6 highway and Lerkendal Stadion. It is one of the churches for the Nidelven parish which is part of the Strinda prosti (deanery) in the Diocese of Nidaros. The white plastered brick church was built in a long church style in 1960 using plans drawn up by the architect Roar Tønseth. The church seats about 240 people.

History
The first church here was built in the late 1950s and it was completed in 1960. The new building was consecrated on 24 April 1960 by the Bishop Arne Fjellbu. In 1975, the church was expanded to the north.

See also
List of churches in Nidaros

References

Churches in Trondheim
Churches in Trøndelag
Long churches in Norway
Brick churches in Norway
20th-century Church of Norway church buildings
Churches completed in 1960
1960 establishments in Norway